Xenology may refer to:

Xenology, studies of aliens (foreigners or extraterrestrials)
Sequence homology#Xenology, homology resulting from horizontal gene transfer
Krzysztof Wodiczko#Xenology, an artistic concept of Wodiczko